Tadeusz Kurcyusz (pseudonyms: Fiszer, gen. Mars, Morski, Żegota) (15 October 1881, Warsaw - 22 or 23 April 1944) was a colonel of the Polish Army. He was in command of the National Armed Forces (NSZ) from August 1, 1943 until his death in April 1944. He was posthumously given the rank of Brigadier General.

1881 births
1944 deaths
Military personnel from Warsaw
People from Warsaw Governorate
Polish generals
Russian military personnel of World War I
People of the Polish May Coup (pro-government side)
National Armed Forces members